Nizhny Rystyug is a rural locality (a village) in Krasnopolyanskoye Rural Settlement, Nikolsky District, Vologda Oblast, Russia. The population was 25 as of 2002.

Geography 
Nizhny Rystyug is located 12 km northeast of Nikolsk (the district's administrative centre) by road. Zhivotovo is the nearest rural locality.

References 

Rural localities in Nikolsky District, Vologda Oblast